Micheál Ó Conghaile was an Irish scribe.

Ó Conghaile transcribed poetry, including Dán na Gaoithe Móire (Night of the Big Wind) and Dán an cholera. He also transmitted poetry by Antoine Ó Raifteiri and old folk poems. He died ar thaoibh an bhóthair near the National School of Ballinderreen in the parish of Cummer, County Galway.

One scholar who examined his manuscripts, Tomás de Róiste, despaired of understanding Ó Conghaile difficult script, saying "The handwriting is something terrible to make out ... I had it 4 years and found it a Chinese puzzle!"

See also

 Seán Ó Catháin
 Mícheál Ó Ceallaigh

References

 Scríobhaithe Lámhscríbhinní Gaeilge I nGaillimh 1700-1900, William Mahon, in "Galway:History and Society", 1996

People from County Galway
Year of death missing
Year of birth missing
Irish scribes